The  Commander United Kingdom Task Group (COMUKTG ) was a senior Royal Navy operational appointment from April 1992 to March 2015. In March 2015 the post was renamed Commander Amphibious Task Group.

History
In April 1992, the Royal Navy re-designated the First Flotilla the Surface Flotilla, would now be responsible for operational readiness and training. Flag Officer, Second Flotilla, Rear-Admiral John Brigstocke, became Commander UK Task Group - who would command any deployed task group. The Third Flotilla was abolished. Between 1992 and 2001 Commander UK Task Group reported to the Commander-in-Chief Fleet.

In April 2001 COMUKTG was re-named Commander United  Kingdom Maritime Forces (COMUKMARFOR) at the rank of Rear-Admiral (2 star). The title COMUKTG remained in use but as a subordinate 1 star role under COMUKMARFOR. 

Following the 2010 Strategic Defence and Security Review and implemented in January 2011 the Commander UK Task Group became Deputy Commander United Kingdom Maritime Forces.  The same month the Commander Amphibious Task Group assumes the role of COMUKTG. The  UK Amphibious Task Group was also renamed to be the Response Force Task Group (RFTG). In March 2015 the post was renamed back to  Commander Amphibious Task Group.

Commander UK Task Group
Included:
 Rear-Admiral John R. Brigstocke: April 1992-September 1993 
 Rear-Admiral Michael P. Gretton: September 1993-December 1994 
 Rear-Admiral Peter M. Franklyn: December 1994-February 1996 
 Rear-Admiral Alan W.J. West: February 1996-October 1997 
 Rear-Admiral Ian A. Forbes: October 1997-February 2000 
 Rear-Admiral Stephen R. Meyer: February 2000-April 2001

Note: COMUKTG post renamed Commander, United  Kingdom Maritime Forces in 2001 and continues as a 2 Star rank  the post COMUKTG continues post April 2001 as a subordinate 1 Star role under  (COMUKMARFOR) 

 Commodore Hugh A.H.G. Edleston: April 2001-January 2002
 Commodore James R. Fanshawe: January–December 2002
 Commodore Richard D. Leaman: January–June 2003
 Commodore Anthony J. Rix: November 2003-January 2006
 Commodore Bruce N.B. Williams: January 2006-December 2007
 Commodore Duncan L. Potts: December 2007-December 2008
 Commodore James A. Morse: December 2008-January 2011

Note: COMUKTG post renamed Deputy Commander United Kingdom Maritime Forces in January 2011 the former Commander Amphibious Task Group assumes the role of COMUKTG

Included:
 Commodore John M. L. Kingwell: January-November 2011 
 Commodore Patrick A. McAlpine: November 2011-February 2014 
 Commodore Jeremy P. Kyd: February 2014-February 2015 
 Commodore Martin J. Connell: February - March 2015

Note: COMUKTG post is renamed back to Commander Amphibious Task Group in March 2015 Cmdre Connell continues in that role till May 2016

Notes

References 
 Mackie, Colin. (2018) "Royal Navy Senior Appointments from 1865" (PDF). gulabin.com. Colin Mackie. Scotland, UK.
 Watson, Dr Graham; Smith, Gordon (12 July 2015). "Royal Navy Organisation and Ship Deployment 1947-2013". www.naval-history.net. G. Smith.

U
Military units and formations established in 1992
Military units and formations disestablished in 2015